Kristina Håkansson is an analytical chemist known for her contribution in Fourier transform ion cyclotron resonance (FT-ICR) mass spectrometry for biomolecular identification and structural characterization. Currently, she holds the position of Professor of Chemistry at University of Michigan. Her research focuses on mass spectrometry, primarily identification and characterization of protein posttranslational modifications by complementary fragmentation techniques such as electron-capture dissociation (ECD)/negative ion ECD (niECD) and infrared multiphoton dissociation (IRMPD) at low (femtomole) levels.

She won the American Society for Mass Spectrometry's 2016 Biemann Medal.

Awards

 2022 Berzelius Gold Medal, Swedish Society for Mass Spectrometry
 2018 Agilent Thought Leader Award
 2017 Hach Lecturer, University of Wyoming
 2016 Biemann Medal, American Society for Mass Spectrometry
 2006–2011 National Science Foundation CAREER Award
 2005–2007 Eli Lilly Analytical Chemistry Award
 2005–2008 Dow Corning Assistant Professorship, University of Michigan
 2005 American Society for Mass Spectrometry Research Award
 2004 Elisabeth Caroline Crosby Research Award, University of Michigan
 2004–2007 Searle Scholar Award
 2000–2002 Swedish Foundation for International Cooperation in Research and Higher

References

External links
 
 Lab website
 Faculty page

Year of birth missing (living people)
Living people
Uppsala University alumni
University of Michigan faculty
Mass spectrometrists